USS Queenfish (SS/AGSS-393), a Balao-class submarine, was the first ship of the United States Navy to be named for the queenfish, a small food fish found off the Pacific coast of North America.

Construction and commissioning
Queenfish was laid down by the Portsmouth Navy Yard at Kittery, Maine, on 27 July 1943; launched on 30 November 1943, sponsored by Mrs. Robert A. Theobald; and commissioned 11 March 1944, Lieutenant Commander Charles E. Loughlin in command.

First patrol: August – October 1944 

After shakedown off the United States East Coast and further training in Hawaiian waters, Queenfish set out on her first patrol 4 August 1944, in Luzon Strait. The wolfpack was under the command of E. R. Swinburne, who rode aboard Eugene B. Fluckey's Barb.

Tunny had to withdraw after being damaged by air attack, but on 31 August, Queenfish made her first kill, the 4,700-ton tanker Chiyoda Maru. On 9 September she scored twice more, on 7,097-ton passenger-cargo ship Toyooka Maru and 3,054-ton transport Manshu Maru.

The Japanese had picked up their own survivors from the wreckage, but they made no attempt to save any survivors from among the 2,100 British and Australian prisoners-of-war embarked in the transports. The submarines managed to get 127 out of the water. An approaching typhoon terminated the hunt and the patrol. Queenfish put into Majuro for refit 3 October.

Second and third patrols: October 1944 – January 1945 

Queenfish’s second war patrol was conducted in the northern part of the East China Sea. This time Cdr. Loughlin had pack command as well as ship command. On 8 November Queenfish sank 1,051-ton Keijo Maru and the 1,948-ton Hakko Maru. On 9 November, she sent 2,131-ton Chojusan Maru, a former gunboat, to the bottom. Alerted by ComSubPac to the approach of a large convoy from Manchuria carrying reinforcements for the Philippines, the "Loopers" and another wolfpack, the "Urchins", combined to attack. Queenfish struck first on 15 November, sinking the 9,186-ton escort carrier Akitsu Maru. Over the next two days the subs destroyed eight ships of the convoy, including the 21,000-ton carrier and the largest of the troop transports. The attacks cost the Japanese army defending the Philippines the bulk of a division.

Having received the Presidential Unit Citation for her first two patrols, Queenfish spent her third war patrol, 29 December to 29 January 1945, in the Formosa Straits and waters adjacent to the China coast without sinking any ships.

Fourth and fifth patrols: February – April 1945 

Queenfish returned to the same area for her fourth war patrol, 24 February to 14 April, as a member of another wolf pack. Cdr. After Spot expended all her torpedoes, she left to reload; pack command devolved on Cmdr. Loughlin.

On 1 April Queenfish sank 11,600-ton passenger-cargo ship Awa Maru, killing 2003 people. The ship had been guaranteed safe passage by the United States government, since she was to carry Red Cross relief supplies to Japanese prisoner-of-war camps. The sinking occurred in fog, and Awa Maru was not sounding her fog horn, as required by international treaty.  The incident caused considerable controversy. When the one survivor picked up by Queenfish, Kantaro Shimoda, told his story, Queenfish was ordered back to port; Cdr. Loughlin was relieved of command, tried by court-martial and convicted of one of three charges, negligence in obeying orders and received a "Letter of Admonition" from the Secretary of the Navy. Loughlin survived the war, and though he never again commanded a vessel, he continued his career and eventually attained flag rank.

On 12 April Queenfish rescued the 13-man crew of a U.S. Navy PB4Y-2 of VPB-108 which ditched on 8 April after becoming lost.<ref>Grivno, Steve, "Last Flight of 'Zebra 442' ", Air Enthusiast, Stamford, Lincs., UK, Number 125, September–October 2006, pp.46–55.</ref>Queenfish spent her fifth patrol under Cdr. Frank N. Shamer on lifeguard duty in the East China Sea-Yellow Sea area. She was at Midway preparing for another patrol when the war ended.

 Post-World War II operations, 1945 – 1963 

After overhaul at Mare Island Naval Shipyard, Queenfish assumed duties as Flagship, Submarine Force, Pacific Fleet. Homeported at Pearl Harbor after the war, Queenfish returned to the Far East during March 1946 and in June–July 1949, but spent most of the period to 1950 in training operations in the eastern Pacific. In late 1947 she operated in the Bering Sea.

In February and March 1950 Queenfish took part in combined Operations with units of the U.S. Pacific and British Fleets. She made cruises to Korean waters in 1951 and 1953. In February 1954 she sailed to her new homeport of San Diego. The next four years were spent operating off the west coast of the United States, with the exception of two weeks in Hawaii in late 1956. On 16 January 1958 she departed for a 6-month deployment to WestPac, returning to San Diego 27 July to resume operations off the west coast of the United States.Queenfish was used for the opening and closing scenes and some exterior shots in the 1959 movie Operation Petticoat.Queenfish was reclassified AGSS-393 1 July 1960. She decommissioned and was struck from the Navy List 1 March 1963. Slated for scrapping, she was instead sunk as target by the nuclear-powered submarine  on 14 August 1963.

Honors and awardsQueenfish'' was awarded the Presidential Unit Citation, and received six battle stars for World War II service.

  Presidential Unit Citation

Raiding career

8 Japanese ships

References

External links 

subnet.com: USS Queenfish 
USS Queenfish website
 Kill Record: USS Queenfish
USS Queenfish Collection (#MF0048), East Carolina Manuscript Collection, J. Y. Joyner Library, East Carolina University

 

Balao-class submarines
World War II submarines of the United States
Cold War submarines of the United States
Ships built in Kittery, Maine
1943 ships
Ships sunk as targets
Maritime incidents in 1963